The men's 50 metre rifle prone competition at the 2006 Asian Games in Doha, Qatar was held on 3 and 4 December at the Lusail Shooting Range.

Schedule
All times are Arabia Standard Time (UTC+03:00)

Records

Results

Elimination

Qualification

Final

References 

ISSF Results Overview
Elimination Results
Qualification Results
Final Results

External links
Official website

Men Rifle 50 P